Oscar Alberto Massei (born 29 September 1934) is an Argentine retired  professional football player and coach. He also holds Italian citizenship.

Honours
 Primera División Argentina top scorer: 1955 (21 goals).

References

1934 births
Living people
Argentine footballers
Association football midfielders
Rosario Central footballers
Serie A players
Serie B players
Inter Milan players
U.S. Triestina Calcio 1918 players
S.P.A.L. players
FC Chiasso players
Argentine football managers
Treviso F.B.C. 1993 managers
A.C.R. Messina managers
Calcio Lecco 1912 managers
Argentine Primera División players
A.C. Voghera managers
FC Chiasso managers
FC Lugano managers
Argentine expatriate footballers
Argentine expatriate sportspeople in Italy
Expatriate footballers in Italy
Expatriate football managers in Italy
Argentine expatriate sportspeople in Switzerland
Expatriate footballers in Switzerland
Expatriate football managers in Switzerland